Marco Pierre White (born 11 December 1961) is a British chef, restaurateur, and television personality. He has been dubbed "the first celebrity chef" and the enfant terrible of the UK restaurant scene. In January 1995, aged 33, White became the first British chef to be awarded three Michelin stars. He has trained notable chefs such as Mario Batali, Heston Blumenthal, Shannon Bennett, Gordon Ramsay and Curtis Stone.

Early life
Marco Pierre White was born in Leeds on 11 December 1961, the third of four sons born to Maria-Rosa Gallina, an Italian immigrant from Veneto, and Frank White, a chef. When Marco was six, his mother passed away from a cerebral haemorrhage caused by complications from the birth of Marco's younger brother. He left Allerton High School in Leeds without any qualifications and decided to train as a chef like his father.

Career
White first trained at Hotel St George in Harrogate and then at the Box Tree in Ilkley. In 1981, he went to London with "£7.36, a box of books, and a bag of clothes", and began his classical training as a commis with Albert and Michel Roux at Le Gavroche. He continued his training under Pierre Koffman at La Tante Claire, moving to work in the kitchen of Raymond Blanc at Le Manoir, and later with Nico Ladenis of Chez Nico at Ninety Park Lane. He then branched out on his own, working in the kitchen at the Six Bells public house in the Kings Road with assistant Mario Batali.

In 1987, White opened Harveys in Wandsworth Common, London, where he won his first Michelin star almost immediately, and his second a year later. He also won the Newcomer Award at the 1987 The Catey Awards, run by The Caterer magazine.

White's notable protégés who worked at Harveys include Gordon Ramsay, Phil Howard, Stephen Terry, and Éric Chavot.

He later became chef-patron of The Restaurant Marco Pierre White in the dining room at the former Hyde Park Hotel, where he won the third Michelin star, and then moved to the Oak Room at the Le Méridien Piccadilly Hotel.

In 1995, at the age of 33, White became the first British chef to be awarded three Michelin stars and the youngest chef to achieve three stars to that point. His record was superseded by Massimiliano Alajmo in 2002, who achieved three stars at the age of 28.

Although White worked for seventeen years to pursue his ambition, he ultimately found that, in spite of his accomplishments, recognition and fame, his career did not provide him with adequate returns in his personal life. So, in 1999, he retired and returned his Michelin stars.

Retirement

White announced his retirement from the kitchen in 1999 and cooked his final meal for a paying customer on 23 December at the Oak Room. He also returned all his Michelin Stars. After his retirement, he became a restaurateur. Together with Jimmy Lahoud, he set up White Star Line Ltd, which they operated together for several years before ending their partnership in 2007.

In 2008, White opened his very first steakhouse, the  "MPW Steak & Alehouse" with James Robertson in the Square Mile in London. As co-owners, since 2010 they also operated the Kings Road Steakhouse & Grill in Chelsea. James Robertson had worked for White as a maître d'hôtel, between 1999 and 2003. In May 2016 the two restaurants became the London Steakhouse Co.

White had a stake in the Yew Tree Inn, a 17th-century dining pub near Highclere in Hampshire, although following an acrimonious falling out with his business partners the pub was sold. This was the setting for much of "Marco's Great British Feast", screened on ITV in the summer of 2008. In January 2009, it was reported that White was to charge £5 for a pint of real ale at the venue, making the Yew Tree "one of the most expensive places to drink British real ale in the country". White said: "Most pubs undercharge. You're not just paying for beer, you're paying for the place you drink it in and the people who serve it."

In 2010, White met businessman Nick Taplin, owner of a four-star hotel in North Somerset (UK) called Cadbury House and operator of other venues in the UK. Taplin was looking to improve the in-house restaurant offering across his hotel estate and in October 2010, following discussions with White, opened a Marco Pierre White Steakhouse Bar & Grill at Cadbury House as a franchisee. This was closely followed by restaurants at Hoole Hall and The Cube.

As more hotel owners started making enquiries about a Marco Pierre White restaurant, in 2013, White developed a master franchise with Taplin, and together launched Black And White Hospitality. The business operates a franchise model allowing property owners or investors to open one of the eight Marco Pierre White branded restaurants within their property including Marco Pierre White Steakhouse Bar & Grill, Mr White's English Chophouse, Wheeler's of St James's Oyster Bar & Grill Room, Koffmann & Mr White's, Marco's New York Italian, Wheeler's Fish & Chips, Bardolino Pizzeria Bellini & Espresso Bar and Marconi Coffee & Juice Bar.

White has published several books, including an influential cookbook White Heat, an autobiography called White Slave (entitled The Devil in the Kitchen in North America and in the paperback version), and Wild Food from Land and Sea.

TV and film career

Hell's Kitchen
In September 2007, White was the Head Chef in ITV's Hell's Kitchen television series.

At one point during the series, controversy ensued when White said, "I don't think it was a pikey's picnic tonight." The remark prompted criticism from the Commission for Racial Equality. However, the show was defended by an ITV spokesman, who indicated that warnings about its content were given before transmission, and that White's comment had been challenged by one of the contestants, Lee Ryan. The book accompanying the show, Marco Pierre White in Hell's Kitchen, was published on 23 August 2007 by Ebury Press.

White returned to ITV's screens to present the 4th series of Hell's Kitchen in 2009.

White presented Hell's Kitchen Australia for the Seven Network which aired in 2017. Following comments made by  Masterchef judge Matt Preston about White's son's spending $500,000 of his father's money on drugs and prostitution, White joined this rival programme in retaliation.

Knorr
White is seen in UK adverts for Knorr stock cubes and stock pots, a Unilever brand. In answer to criticisms that he had "sold himself out as a chef" by acting as a brand ambassador for such products he said, "by working with companies like Knorr it allows me to stand onto a bigger stage and enrich people's lives... Michelin stars, they're my past."

Other TV work
On 18 March 2008, it was announced that White would be the host of an American version of the Australian cooking competition series The Chopping Block. The series, produced by Granada America, the production company behind the American version of Hell's Kitchen, aired on NBC in March 2009 but was pulled after three episodes due to low ratings. After a three-month hiatus, Chopping Block returned to complete its season.

On 6 July 2011, White was a guest judge on Masterchef Australia mentoring the cooks in an elimination round. On 15 June 2014, White began a week-long appearance on Masterchef Australia presiding over a mystery box challenge, an invention test and a pressure test. On 17 May 2015, White began his second week-long appearance on Masterchef Australia, in Week 3 of Series 7. On 12 July 2015, he returned for a second week on Masterchef Australia Series 7, entitled "Marco Returns Week". On 8 May 2016, White began his third year running, and fourth week-long appearance on Masterchef Australia, this time Week 2 of Series 8.

On 27 August 2011, White was a houseguest on the UK version of Celebrity Big Brother to set a cooking task.

In 2012, White fronted a new show for Channel 5 called Marco Pierre White's Kitchen Wars. It saw the UK's best restaurant partnerships balance food with front of house service, fighting for a place in a specially designed studio restaurant, where the top couples are each given their own kitchen and set of diners to impress. It received positive reviews from critics in The Guardian and The Independent.

White was a principal judge in Masterchef Australia: The Professionals, which started on 20 January 2013. White co-hosted the show with regular Masterchef Australia host Matt Preston.

On 11 December 2014, White appeared on the South African version of Masterchef which aired on M-Net. He had a cook-along in the final challenge in the finals between Siphokazi and Roxi.
On 6 September 2015, White appeared on the New Zealand version of MasterChef which aired on TV3 (New Zealand). He was the Head Chef/Mentor of a team challenge consisting of the final 8.

Controversies

Treatment of customers and employees
During his early career working in the kitchen at Harveys, White regularly ejected patrons from the restaurant if he took offence at their comments. When a customer asked if he could have chips with his lunch, White hand-cut and personally cooked the chips, but charged the customer £25 for his time.

During his time at Harveys, White would regularly act unpredictably, from throwing cheese plates onto the wall to assaulting his head chef who had recently broken his leg. He later said that he "used to go fucking insane". A young chef at Harveys who once complained of heat in the kitchen had the back of his chef's jacket and trousers cut open by White with a sharp paring knife. White also once made a young Gordon Ramsay cry while Ramsay worked for him, and later said, "I don't recall what he'd done wrong but I yelled at him and he lost it. Gordon crouched down in the corner of the kitchen, buried his head in his hands and started sobbing."

Matt Preston 
Following comments made by MasterChef Australia judge Matt Preston about White's son's spending $500,000 of his father's money on drugs and prostitution, White stopped making guest appearances on the show after the 8th season and joined the rival programme Hell's Kitchen Australia in retaliation. In 2016, whilst on The Kyle and Jackie O Show, Preston was asked about Marco Jr.’s time on Big Brother UK, which included his alleged on-air sex and the above admission of purchasing illicit drugs and sex work. Preston said: "I think it is that terrible thing when you have kids that go off the rails... the drugs might be a little bit of a worry". White later said of Preston that "I will never forgive that man [Preston]... with my hand on my mother's grave I will get that man." White eventually returned to the programme in season 14, after Preston had left the show.

English wine and West Country food 
In September 2017, White opened a new restaurant in Plymouth. At the opening, he was critical of the quality of English wine, describing it as "nonsense" and caused controversy by saying, "London is the No 1 food destination, full stop. It has the talent and (the people who can pay) the prices ... How many three-Michelin-star restaurants does Cornwall have? None."

He went on, however, to praise the efforts of a rival hotel in the city, the Duke of Cornwall, describing it as "a lovely place". He also added that while he had not eaten food produced by Nathan Outlaw, a Cornish Michelin star chef, he had read his books and seen his recipes and believed "he cooks very well".

Personal life
White has been married three times. His first wife was Alex McArthur, whom he married at Chelsea Register Office on 8 June 1988. They had a daughter, Letitia, before divorcing in 1990.

White met 21-year-old model Lisa Butcher at a London nightclub, and they were engaged within three weeks. Engaged for two months, Butcher sold the coverage of the wedding in a £20,000 deal with Hello! magazine. The wedding took place at the Brompton Oratory on 15 August 1992.

In 1992, White began an affair with Matilde Conejero, the bar manager at The Canteen in Chelsea Harbour, and divorced Butcher for her. The couple had two sons and a daughter, and were married at the Belvedere restaurant in Holland Park on 7 April 2000. After White became friends with city financier Robin Saunders, Conejero suspected an affair between the two; they had a fight in January 2005, after which White spent 14 hours in the cells of Notting Hill police station. They separated some time later.

White has been a supporter of the Conservative Party and the football team Manchester City FC.

See also
 Paul Liebrandt

References

External links

H Talent Management Marco Pierre White Client Biography

1961 births
English people of Italian descent
Living people
British restaurateurs
English autobiographers
English chefs
English expatriates in Australia
English expatriates in New Zealand
English expatriates in South Africa
English expatriates in the United States
English restaurateurs
English food writers
People educated at Allerton High School
Head chefs of Michelin starred restaurants
Conservative Party (UK) people
Businesspeople from Leeds
Male chefs